Dealing With Damage are a British four-piece punk/melodic hardcore band from London, England. The band was formed in 2015 by singer-songwriter/guitarist Ed Wenn (formerly of The Stupids) and drummer James Sherry (formerly of Done Lying Down). They have received coverage on sites such as Kerrang!, Louder Than War and Vive Le Rock and played with notable bands including Soulside, Moving Targets, the Messthetics, Ruts DC, Janus Stark, Zounds, Inner Terrestrials, Girls Against Boys and Eight Rounds Rapid.

The band’s initial line up was Wenn, Sherry, guitarist Rich Matthews (all ex-K-Line) and bassist Giles Davis. Davis was replaced by Paul Grier (ex-Scum Children) during the recording of first EP Navigating The Middle Ground. The EP was released in 2016 and included a cover of an Iris DeMent song. Second EP Don’t Give Into Fear was produced and mixed by John Hannon (ex-Understand) and released on the Boss Tuneage label in 2017, after which John Ruscoe (ex-Perfect Daze/Sink) replaced Matthews on guitar. The Home Security EP followed in 2020 and included a cover of a 13th Floor Elevators song.

Dealing With Damage’s debut album Ask The Questions was released on Little Rocket Records in 2020 - with a joint vinyl release by Rad Girlfriend Records (Dayton, Ohio, USA) and Carabrecol (Gran Canaria, Spain) - to positive reviews The LP saw contributions from Andy Myers (ex-Jerry Built) who subsequently replaced Ruscoe on guitar.

Dealing With Damage released their second LP Use The Daylight in February 2023, to universally positive reviews; the album included a tribute to John Hannon and a collaboration with 'menopause-core' trio Yootha Today.

The band have been likened to bands such as Fugazi, Rites of Spring, Soulside, Mission of Burma, Hüsker Dü, Buzzcocks, Down By Law, Toxic Reasons, Dag Nasty and Government Issue

Discography

Albums
Ask The Questions, CD (Little Rocket Records, 2020)
Ask More Questions, LP (Little Rocket/Rad Girlfriend/Carabrecol, 2021) [re-release with extra tracks]
Use The Daylight, LP (Little Rocket/Rad Girlfriend, 2023)

EPs
Navigating The Middle Ground (2016)
Don’t Give Into Fear (Boss Tuneage, 2017)
Home Security (Little Rocket Records, 2020)

Compilations
3EPs (2021)

Compilation appearances
“Speeding Up” on Rebellion Festival New Band (Introducing) Stage 2018 (JSNTGM Records, CD)
“Making Plans For Misery” on The Scene That Would Not Die: Twenty Years Of Post-Millennial Punk In The UK (Engineer Records, 2021)
“We Make Bombs To Feel Safe” on Punk For Ukraine Vol. #1(Grimace Records, 2022)

References

External links
 https://dealingwithdamage.com/

English punk rock groups
Musical groups established in 2015
Musical groups from London
2015 establishments in England
British post-hardcore musical groups
Underground punk scene in the United Kingdom